This is a list of countries by cherry production from the years 2016 to 2020, based on data from the Food and Agriculture Organization Corporate Statistical Database. The estimated total world production for 2020 was 4,088,595 metric tonnes, increasing by 1.3% from 4,036,859 tonnes in 2019. Turkey was the largest producer of cherries, accounting for over 22% of global production.

Production by country

Notes

References 

Cherry
Cherries
Cherries
Cherries